Marko Raguž (born 10 June 1998) is an Austrian professional footballer who plays as a forward for  Austria Wien and represents Austria internationally at youth level.

Club career
Raguž made his Austrian Football First League debut for LASK on 3 March 2017 in a game against Wacker Innsbruck and scored on his debut. On 1 July 2022, Raguž will be transferred to Austria Wien of the Austrian Bundesliga.

Personal life 
Raguž's parents are from Novi Travnik in Bosnia and Herzegovina. He is eligible to play for Austria, Bosnia and Herzegovina and Croatia internationally.

Career statistics

References

External links
 
 Marko Raguž ÖFB

Living people
1998 births
People from Grieskirchen District
Austrian people of Bosnia and Herzegovina descent
Austrian people of Croatian descent
Footballers from Upper Austria
Austrian footballers
Association football forwards
Austria youth international footballers
FC Juniors OÖ players
LASK players
FK Austria Wien players
2. Liga (Austria) players
Austrian Football Bundesliga players